Wema Bank Plc, commonly known as Wema Bank, is a Nigerian commercial bank. It is licensed by the Central Bank of Nigeria; the regulator of the nation's banking sector. As of 2019, Wema bank operates the largest digital banking system in Nigeria, ALAT By Wema, which is fully in use in all of the nation's thirty seven states and territory.

History

The bank was established on May 2, 1945, as a private limited liability company (under the old name of Agbonmagbe Bank Limited). The bank was founded on May 2, 1945 as Agbonmagbe Bank by the Late Chief Mathew Adekoya Okupe. He set up the first branches of the bank which were in Ebute-metta, Sagamu, Abeokuta and Ijebu-Igbo. The bank remained his until it was taken over by Western Nigeria Marketing Board and later renamed Wema Bank Limited in 1969. Since then, Wema Bank has gone on to be Nigeria's longest surviving indigenous bank. It was granted a commercial banking license and commenced banking activities during the same year. Wema Bank converted to a public limited liability company in 1987. In 1990, the Bank was listed on the Nigerian Stock Exchange. It trades under the symbol: WEMABANK. It was granted a Universal Banking License in February 2001.

In December 2015, Wema became a national bank, with a capital base of over N43.8billion having met the regulatory requirements for the National Banking license as stipulated  by the Central Bank of Nigeria

Ownership
Wema Bank Plc. is a publicly-traded limited liability company, trading under the symbol WEMABANK on the Nigerian Stock Exchange. According to the company website, the shareholding in the bank is as depicted in the table below:

ALAT also known as ALAT by Wema is a digital bank based in Nigeria. The bank is branchless and paperless.

History
ALAT was launched on May 2, 2017 by Wema Bank Plc, a Nigerian commercial bank. During its first year, ALAT by Wema acquired more than 250,000 customers responsible for well over NGN 1.6bn ($4.48m) in general deposits. In 2018, the bank closed in the NGN 1bn ($2.78m) mark in terms of deposits into savings accounts.

ALAT For Business
ALAT For Business is the corporate version of ALAT.

Leadership
Mr Babatunde Kasali is the Chairman of the Bank; Ademola Adebise is the Managing Director/CEO.

Branch Network
Wema Bank operates a network of over 149 branches and service stations backed by a robust ICT platform across Nigeria. Wema Bank today has become one of the Founding Signatories of the Principles  and for Responsible Banking, committing to strategically align its business with the Sustainable Development Goals and the Paris Agreement on Climate Change.

Digital Transformation
 
ALAT By Wema
 
Wema Bank launched the first fully digital bank in Nigeria, ALAT By Wema, in May 2017. In a bid to redefine experiential banking in Nigeria, the branchless, paperless bank reduced the stress of having to walk into a branch to open an account with a seamless sign up process using a mobile phone, PC or tablet.

Hackaholics – The Wema Bank Hackathon
In March 2019, it hosted Hackaholics - its first hackathon.

See also
 List of banks in Nigeria
 Economy of Nigeria

References

Banks of Nigeria
Companies listed on the Nigerian Stock Exchange
Companies based in Lagos
Banks established in 1945
1945 establishments in Nigeria